The "I Want" song (also called an "I Wish" song) is a popular type of song featured in musical theatre, and has become a particularly popular term through its use to describe a series of songs featured in Disney Renaissance films that had the main character singing about how they are unsatisfied with their current life, and what they are searching for. The term I Want' song" is believed to have been coined by Lehman Engel.

Purpose
Composer Stephen Schwartz explains the concept in regard to the 1995 Disney film Pocahontas:

Placement within a musical
John Kenrick, a college professor of musical history and the author of the encyclopedia Musicals 101, explains: "The Main "I Want" Song comes early in the first act, with one or more of the main characters singing about the key motivating desire that will propel everyone (including the audience) through the remainder of the show. It is often followed by a reprise.

In many cases, these songs literally include the words "I want", "I wish" or "I've got to". Classic examples include The Little Mermaids "Part of Your World", My Fair Ladys "Wouldn't It Be Loverly", Carnivals "Mira", The Sound of Musics "I Have Confidence", Wicked "The Wizard and I", The Book of Mormon "You and Me (But Mostly Me)", Hamilton "My Shot" and "Wait for It", The Producerss "King of Broadway" and Dear Evan Hansen "Waving Through a Window." Stephen Sondheim and James Lapine's 1986 Broadway musical Into the Woods begins and ends with a character saying "I wish". For earlier examples, see "Over the Rainbow" from The Wizard of Oz (1939) or "It Might as Well Be Spring" from State Fair (1945).Bob Fosse said there were only three types of show songs from a director's point of view: "I Am" songs – a song that explains a character/situation, "I Want" songs – desire and motivations, and "New songs" – songs that do not fit the other categories.

Beyond a musical
Schwartz also notes "I Want" songs are usually those which have a life beyond the production they were featured in:

Historical composition
Schwartz has also written "I Want" songs for live action musicals, including "Corner of the Sky" for Pippin and "The Wizard and I" for Wicked.

Disney
The Walt Disney Company has a long tradition of "I Want" songs in Disney animated musicals going back to the Disney Renaissance era due to Howard Ashman's work with the company. The term has retroactively been used to describe older "I Want" songs. In a top ten list of Disney, The Daily Dot ranked Robin Hoods "Not in Nottingham" as the best "I Want" song. The site also noted that these could be sung by antagonists, ranking The Hunchback of Notre Dames "Hellfire" at number 5. FanPop listed "Part of Your World" from The Little Mermaid as the best song of this type. The WFPL article Great 'I Want' Moments in Musicals listed "Belle", "Somewhere That's Green" from Little Shop of Horrors, "Wouldn't It Be Loverly", "Lonely Room", "Corner of the Sky" from Pippin, and "Part of Your World".

References

Song forms